Between Valleys is a Brazilian drama film in co-production with Germany and Uruguay. It premiered at the Festival do Rio in September 2012. It was also screened at the Festlatino - "Latin American Film Festival of São Paulo" and at the Seattle International Film Festival. A premiere took place in the city of Paulínia, where some scenes were filmed in April 2013.

Plot
Vicente is an economist, father of Caio and married with Marina, a dedicated dentist. He leads an ordinary life both at home and work. However, a loss followed by another ultimately leads him to a life completely miserable. He changes his name and starts living in a garbage dump.

Cast
 Ângelo Antônio as Antônio / Vicente
 Daniel Hendler as Carlos
 Clayton Mariano as Edimilson

References

External links

2012 films
Brazilian drama films
German drama films
2012 drama films
Films shot in Paulínia
Uruguayan drama films
2010s Portuguese-language films
2010s German films